Bobby Brown (born 23 November 1955) is a Scottish former professional footballer who played as a full back.

Career
Born in Carluke, Brown played for  Workington, Penrith, Queen of the South and Wigton.

His father Bobby also played for Workington.

References

1955 births
Living people
Scottish footballers
Workington A.F.C. players
Penrith F.C. players
Queen of the South F.C. players
English Football League players
Scottish Football League players
Association football fullbacks
People from Carluke
Footballers from South Lanarkshire